Meridian Condominiums is the 19th tallest building in San Diego, California and is a prominent fixture in San Diego's skyline. It has a height of 371 ft (113 m) and contains 172 units. Located at 700 Front Street in the Horton Plaza district of Downtown San Diego, Meridian Condominiums is a 28-story building that utilizes a modern architectural style designed by the architect firm Maxwell Starkman & Associates. The skyscraper was built at a cost of $71.1 million.

See also
List of tallest buildings in San Diego

References

External links 

Official site
Meridian Condominiums at Emporis.com
Meridian Condominiums at SkyscraperPage.com

Residential buildings completed in 1985
Residential skyscrapers in San Diego